Bhojunda Stromatolite Park is located near Bhojunda village which is about 6 km south-west of Chittaurgarh city in Rajasthan, India. It is spread across 8 acres on either side of the Chittaurgarh-Udaipur state highway. It was declared as a National Geological Monument in 1976 by GSI.

About 
Bhojunda stromatolite park is an exposure inside the Bhagwanpura Limestone of the Lower Vindhyan range. They are formed by blue-green algae which forms a mat by attracting and bonding carbonate particles through their filaments into stratiform, columnar and nodular structures in carbonate rocks.  Stromatolites are an indication of the earliest form of life on earth and is formed by a combination of life activity, sediment trapping and binding activity of algae and bacteria. They generally form in shallow water.

References 

Parks in India
National Geological Monuments in India